Soumahoro Bangaly (born July 18, 1991) is an Ivorian professional footballer plays for Al-Ansar as a center back.

Professional career
After a brief passport issue was resolved, Bangaly signed with Romanian Liga II club Râmnicu Vâlcea as a free agent in early 2012. He made his Liga II debut on April 25, 2012, playing the full 90 minutes of a 2–2 draw against Argeș Pitești. He made only one more appearance for Râmnicu Vâlcea before returning to his home country and joining ASEC Mimosas. He was selected as the league's player of the month in May 2015, and was subsequently nominated for the Player of the Year award at the "Ivorian Football Oscars" a few months afterwards.

Bangaly left Ivory Coast once again in September 2015, when he was signed by South African Premier Division club Mamelodi Sundowns to compensate for the loss of Alje Schut, who returned to play in the Netherlands. He made his professional debut with the club on September 15, 2015, during a 2–1 loss to Golden Arrows. He was replaced at halftime by manager Pitso Mosimane after several mistakes, most notably failing to clear a ball which lead to the Golden Arrows' opening goal. It was also obvious he experienced communication issues, as he had hardly learned English. He only received nine minutes of playing time the rest of the calendar year, although reports showed he'd "been settling in and showing improvement in his performances and work rate" by December. By April 2016, he had fully integrated and was a regular member of the starting XI following several impressive performance in the CAF Champions League.

International career
Bangaly is of Guinean descent through his mother, and received a callup to the Guinea national football team in May 2018.

Honours

Club
Mamelodi Sundowns
 Premier Division: 2015–16,
2017–18
 League Cup: 2015
 MTN 8 Cup: Runners-up 2016
 CAF Champions League: 2016
 CAF Super Cup: 2017

References

External links

 Mamelodi Sundowns profile

Living people
1991 births
Ivorian footballers
Ivorian people of Guinean descent
Ivorian expatriate footballers
Association football central defenders
ASEC Mimosas players
Mamelodi Sundowns F.C. players
SuperSport United F.C. players
Al-Ansar FC (Medina) players
Liga II players
Saudi Second Division players
Ivorian expatriate sportspeople in Romania
Ivorian expatriate sportspeople in South Africa
Ivorian expatriate sportspeople in Saudi Arabia
Expatriate footballers in Romania
Expatriate soccer players in South Africa
Expatriate footballers in Saudi Arabia
People from Adzopé
SCM Râmnicu Vâlcea players
Academie de Foot Amadou Diallo players